The 462d Tactical Fighter Squadron is an inactive United States Air Force unit. It was last assigned to the 506th Tactical Fighter Wing, stationed at Tinker Air Force Base, Oklahoma.  It was inactivated on 1 April 1959.

History
Trained in the continental United States, Oct 1944 – Feb 1945. Moved to western Pacific Ocean in spring of 1945. Escorted B-29 bombers in raids against Japan, and attacked targets such as enemy airfields, May-Aug 1945. Between 1953 and 1959 the unit trained for a variety of tactical air missions. Frequently deployed for training exercises, some of them overseas.

Lineage
 Constituted as 462d Fighter Squadron, Single Engine, on 5 Oct 1944
 Activated on 21 Oct 1944
 Inactivated on 16 Dec 1945
 Re-designated as 462d Strategic Fighter Squadron on 20 Nov 1952
 Activated on 20 Jan 1953
 Predesignated as: 462d Fighter-Day Squadron on 1 Jul 1957
 Predesignated as: 462d Fighter-Bomber Squadron on 1 Jan 1958
 Predesignated as: 462d Tactical Fighter Squadron on 1 Jul 1958
 Inactivated on 1 Apr 1959

Assignments
 506th Fighter Group, 21 Oct 1944 – 16 Dec 1945
 506th Strategic Fighter (later, 506 Fighter-Day; 506 Fighter-Bomber; 506 Tactical Fighter) Wing, 20 Jan 1953 – 1 Apr 1959

Stations
 Lakeland Army Airfield, Florida, 21 Oct 1944 – 16 Feb 1945
 North Field, Iwo Jima, 25 Apr – 3 Dec 1945
 Air echelon operated from West Field, Tinian, 23 Mar – 11 May 1945
 Camp Anza, California, 15-16 Dec 1945
 Dow AFB, Maine, 20 Jan 1953
 Tinker AFB, Oklahoma, 20 Mar 1955 – 1 Apr 1959

Aircraft
 P-51 Mustang, 1944-1945
 F-84 Thunderjet, 1953-1957
 F-100 Super Sabre, 1957-1958

References

 

462
Fighter 0462